Victor Dominicis is a New York punk rock guitarist known for the bands Nausea and for playing bass guitar in Reagan Youth. He is notable for being a pioneer in the American crust punk style blending punk and heavy metal. His influence can be seen in countless metal and punk bands that have followed. He currently plays lead guitar in the New York-based surf/instrumental group The Coffin Daggers.

References

External links
interview with Nausea including Vic
Nausea official website
Coffin Daggers official website

Anarcho-punk musicians
Living people
Reagan Youth members
American punk rock guitarists
Nausea (band) members
Year of birth missing (living people)